Aspelin is a surname. Notable people with this surname include:

 Arthur Aspelin (1868–1949), Finnish military officer
 Gunnar Aspelin (1898–1977), Swedish professor of philosophy 
 Gustaf Aspelin (1857–1917), Swedish-Norwegian mining engineer, entrepreneur, wholesaler and consul
 J.R. Aspelin (1842–1915), Finnish archaeologist
 Jonas Aspelin (1884–1964), Norwegian businessperson
 Marianne Aspelin (born 1966), Norwegian curler
 Simon Aspelin (born 1974), Swedish tennis player
 Tobias Aspelin (born 1968), Swedish actor
 Waldemar Aspelin (1854–1923), Finnish architect